The Gold Bug Variations is a novel by American writer Richard Powers, first released in 1991.

Plot introduction
The novel intertwines the discovery of the chemical structure of DNA with the musicality of Johann Sebastian Bach's harpsichord composition the Goldberg Variations. A similar theme is explored by Douglas Hofstadter in his 1979 book Gödel, Escher, Bach: an Eternal Golden Braid. The title also alludes to Edgar Allan Poe's 1843 short story "The Gold-Bug", which is also incorporated in the plot of the novel.

The plot hinges on two love affairs: the first set in the 1950s, between two scientists intent on discovering the mysteries of DNA; the second in the 1980s, between two lovers who befriend the scientist featured in the novel's flashbacks.

Awards

The Gold Bug Variations has received the following awards:

 Time magazine Book of the Year, 1991
 Publishers Weekly Best Books of 1991
 Vrij Nederland Best Books of 1991
 New York Times Notable Book, 1991
 De Morgen Best Book of 1991 (named in 1999, in a compilation of the best books each year over the last half century)
 Finalist, National Book Critics Circle Award for Fiction, 1991

References

External links

Bibliography of editions of Gold Bug Variations.
Listing of reviews and writings about Gold Bug Variations.

1991 American novels
Novels by Richard Powers
Postmodern novels